is a former Japanese football player.

Club statistics

References

External links

1983 births
Living people
University of Tsukuba alumni
Association football people from Saga Prefecture
Japanese footballers
J1 League players
J2 League players
Albirex Niigata players
Yokohama FC players
Tochigi SC players
Association football defenders